Yafa is an Arab tribe, geographical area, and district inhabited by the Yafa'i tribe in South Arabia, located in Lahij Governorate, southern Yemen. It is one of the biggest tribes that descended from the ancient Himyarites. Today, most members of the tribe can be found across the Arabian Peninsula, in particular Yemen, Saudi Arabia, Bahrain, The United Arab Emirates, and Qatar, wherein it is estimated that the Yafa' tribe makes up the second-largest Arabian tribe among the Qatari society, with the Al Murrah tribe coming first. According to Arab historian Abu Muhammad al-Hasan al-Hamdani, the genealogy of Yafa is of the following: "Yafa' bin Qawel bin Zaid bin Naaitah bin Sharhabel bin Al Harth bin Yareem dhi Raain bin Zaid bin Sahal bin Amer bin Qais bin Muawiyah bin Joshom bin Abd Shams  bin Wael bin Al Ghawth bin Al Humaysaa bin Himyar bin Saba."

Yafa has gone through a complex structuration of different tribal forms in the last several centuries. The division comprises Yafi' bani Qasid (Lower Yafa or Yafa as-Sufla) and Yafi' bani Malik (Upper Yafa or Yafa al-Ulya), each including five branches and sheikhdoms.

Branches of Yafa 
 Al-Harm (آل هرم)

Branches of Yafa bani Qasid:
 Kaladi (كلدي)
 Saadi (سعدي)
 Yazeedi (يزيدي)
 Nakhibi (ناخبي)
 Yehri (يهري).

Branches of Yafa bani Malik:
 Maflahi (مفلحي)
 Mawsata (الموسطة)
 Al-Dhubi (الضُبي)
 Al-Busi (البعسي)
 Hadhrami (الحضرمي).

The area is located northeast of the port city of Aden. In ancient times, the area was referred to as Dehsim or Saro Himyar. The once ruling Qu'aiti dynasty of Hadramaut was Yafa’i in origin. Yafa was united with the rest of Arabia under the Rashidun Caliphate.

See also
 Himyarite Kingdom
 Upper Yafa
 Lower Yafa
 List of Sunni dynasties
 Rashidun Caliphate

References

Geography of Yemen
Tribes of Arabia
Yemeni tribes
South Arabia